Bad Niedernau is a suburban district of Rottenburg am Neckar in the administrative district of Tübingen in Baden-Württemberg (Germany).

Geography 

Bad Niedernau is located 3 km (1.86 mi) southwest of Rottenburg am Neckar in the Neckar-valley with an elevation from 430 to 475 m.

Extent 

The area of the district is 410 hectares. 52.5% is agriculturally used area, 32.3% forest area, 7.7% settled area and roads, 5.3% water expanse, and 2.2% other.

Neighbour localities 

The following territories adjoin to Bad Niedernau, clockwise beginning in the north they are: Rottenburg (town), Weiler, Schwalldorf and Obernau (all in the admin. district of Tübingen). Weiler, Schwalldorf and Obernau are districts of Rottenburg am Neckar.

Population 

Bad Niedernau has a current population of 569 people (31/01/08). In order to that Bad Niedernau is among the smaller districts of Rottenburg. The population density is 139 people per km² (359 per sq mi), according to an area of 4.10 km² (1.6 sq mi).

Faiths 

The population of the village is predominantly Roman Catholic.

Personalities

Honorary Citizens 

The former municipality of Bad Niedernau has awarded the honorary citizenship to Kilian von Steiner (Banker) in 1891.

References

External links 
 Official Webpage (German)
 Historical picture postcards

Rottenburg am Neckar
Spa towns in Germany